The Bellarmine Knights are the athletic teams that represent Bellarmine University, located in Louisville, Kentucky, in intercollegiate sports as a member of the NCAA Division I ranks, primarily competing in the ASUN Conference for most sports in the 2020–21 academic year. The Knights previously competed in the Great Lakes Valley Conference (GLVC) of the NCAA Division II ranks from 1978–79 to 2019–20.

Overview
On June 18, 2019, it was officially announced that the Knights would join the ASUN beginning in the 2020–21 school year, starting a four-year transition to NCAA Division I. Four Bellarmine teams in sports that are not sponsored by the ASUN have varied homes. Bellarmine has been a member of the Southern Conference (SoCon) for wrestling since it joined the ASUN. The Knights had also been SoCon members in men's lacrosse, a sport in which  they have competed as Division I members since the 2005 season (2004–05 school year), before the ASUN reinstated men's lacrosse in the 2022 season. Men's and women's swimming and diving joined the Coastal Collegiate Sports Association, a league with which the ASUN is a partner. Field hockey became a Division I independent for 2020–21, and joined the Mid-American Conference as an affiliate member in July 2021. During the transition period, Knights teams other than men's lacrosse are ineligible for NCAA-sanctioned postseason play. Men's lacrosse is not subject to this restriction because it had been a D-I member before the transition.

Varsity teams 
Bellarmine competes in 25 intercollegiate varsity sports: Men's sports include baseball, basketball, cross country, golf, lacrosse, soccer, sprint football, swimming, tennis, track & field and wrestling; while women's sports include basketball, cross country, field hockey, golf, soccer, softball, swimming, tennis, track & field, volleyball. Cheerleading and dance are listed as co-ed sports on Bellarmine's athletic website, although the dance team is all-female.

Notes

Championships 
On March 26, 2011, the Knights won the NCAA Men's Division II Basketball Championship.

On April 10, 2015 the Bellarmine University Dance Team captured their first national title at the 2015 NDA Collegiate Dance Championship. On April 5, 2019, the team captured its second national title at the 2019 NDA Collegiate Dance Championship.

Individual sports

Lacrosse 

The university announced the athletic department would begin sponsoring men's lacrosse in 2004. BU hired Jack McGetrick as the program's first head coach. In 2005 the team competed as independent members in NCAA Division I. In 2007 the Knights joined the Great Western Lacrosse League (GWLL) after the league lost Butler to athletic department cuts. In 2010 the GWLL ceased operations after Notre Dame left the league for the Big East. Bellarmine and the remaining members of the GWLL joined the ECAC Lacrosse League.

Tragedy struck the Knights Lacrosse program in October 2010 when coach McGetrick died after a long battle with cancer. Since founding the program he led the Knights to a 45–41 record. Before Bellarmine, McGetrick coached of the University of Hartford Hawks for 11 seasons. McGetrick ranks in the top-50 of Division I men's lacrosse coaches with a record of 132–115.

The 2014 season was Bellarmine's last in ECAC Lacrosse. After the Big Ten Conference announced it would begin sponsoring both men's and women's lacrosse in the 2014–15 school year (2015 season), which took two of the six schools then in the league, Bellarmine announced it would become a lacrosse-only member of the ASUN effective in July 2014. However, before the conference move took effect, the ASUN and Southern Conference (SoCon) announced an agreement under which sponsorship of men's lacrosse would switch from the ASUN to the SoCon after the 2014 season. Accordingly, Bellarmine lacrosse began SoCon play in the 2015 season.

The ASUN–SoCon lacrosse partnership took a new form after the 2021 season when the ASUN reinstated its men's lacrosse league. Bellarmine was joined in the revived ASUN league by five new single-sport members—Air Force, which also moved from SoCon lacrosse; Detroit Mercy, previously a single-sport member of the Metro Atlantic Athletic Conference; and three of the four 2021 independents in Cleveland State, Robert Morris, and Utah. The other full ASUN member with men's lacrosse, Jacksonville, remained in SoCon men's lacrosse.

A men's lacrosse realignment triggered by the expectation and ultimate announcement of a new Atlantic 10 Conference men's lacrosse league led to the shuttering of SoCon men's lacrosse after the 2022 season. Jacksonville returned to ASUN men's lacrosse, and full SoCon member and current ASUN beach volleyball associate Mercer added men's lacrosse to its ASUN membership. Former GLVC member Lindenwood, which joined the D-I Ohio Valley Conference (which does not sponsor lacrosse) in July 2022, also joined ASUN men's lacrosse.

Basketball 

Men's basketball has been a part of Bellarmine's athletic department since the school's founding in 1950. That same year student Ted Wade became the first black player on an integrated college basketball team in Kentucky. The basketball program has been coached by 11 different men and is currently headed by Louisville native Scott Davenport. Davenport is one of two Bellarmine coaches who have also guided teams to Kentucky's high school championship, both doing so with Louisville schools. He did it in 1988 at Ballard High. The other coach who moved up to the college level was Joe Reibel, who won with St. Xavier High in 1962. Reibel is Bellarmine's winningest coach with a record of 346–277. A unique Bellarmine coach was Bob Valvano. Valvano is an ESPN personality and was a member of Mensa, an international organization for only the brightest two percent of people on Earth. Arguably the most famous Bellarmine coach was Alex Groza, the Fabulous Five (Kentucky Wildcats) great at the University of Kentucky. Groza was an All-American, Gold Medal winner in the 1948 London Olympics and first team NBA.

In its history, the Knights have won five GLVC men's basketball titles and four NCAA Midwest Regional titles. On March 26, 2011, the Knights won its first NCAA Division II National Championship, led by guards Jeremy Kendle and Braydon Hobbs. The Knights defeated BYU–Hawaii for the title, 71-68. The championship game aired on national television on the CBS network. An estimated 2,906 fans were in attendance for the championship game. Most of which were Bellarmine fans that had made the  trip from Louisville to watch the Knights compete in the championship held in Springfield, Massachusetts at the MassMutual Center.

Swimming and diving 
In 2012, Bellarmine University announced the start of its swimming program.

Track and field 
Headed by Coach Chase Broughton

Sprint football 
Bellarmine announced in June 2021 that it would add sprint football as a varsity sport effective in 2022–23. The Knights play in the Midwest Sprint Football League, which launched in 2022 with six members and expanded to eight in 2023. Sprint football is not governed by the NCAA, but is fully incorporated into the Bellarmine Athletics Department.

The Knights play home games at Brother Thomas More Page Stadium on the nearby campus of Saint Xavier High School.

References

External links